Peter Leismüller (born 13 April 1968) is an Austrian bobsledder. He competed in the four man event at the 1998 Winter Olympics.

References

1968 births
Living people
Austrian male bobsledders
Olympic bobsledders of Austria
Bobsledders at the 1998 Winter Olympics
Sportspeople from Innsbruck